Edessa virididorsata is a species of stink bug within the family Pentatomidae. It is found in Colombia, Venezuela, Guyana, Surinam, French Guiana, Brazil, Paraguay, and Argentina.

References 

Insects described in 2006
Pentatomidae
Insects of Brazil
Arthropods of Argentina
Invertebrates of Venezuela
Invertebrates of Guyana
Fauna of Suriname
Fauna of French Guiana
Invertebrates of Paraguay
Arthropods of Colombia